Andrew Preston may refer to:
 Andrew Preston (businessman) (1846–1924), American businessman
 Andrew Preston (historian) (born 1973), Canadian historian
 Andy Preston (footballer) (born 1957), Australian rules footballer
 Andy Preston (politician) (born 1966), English politician, charity chairman, and businessman

See also
 Andrew Preston Peabody (1811–1893), American clergyman and author